Switzerland competed at the 1976 Summer Olympics in Montreal, Quebec, Canada. 50 competitors, 47 men and 3 women, took part in 41 events in 12 sports.

Medalists
Switzerland finished in 20th position in the final medal rankings, with one gold medal and four medals overall.

Gold
 Christine Stückelberger — Equestrian, Dressage Individual Competition

Silver
 Ulrich Lehmann, Doris Ramseier and Christine Stückelberger — Equestrian, Dressage Team Competition

Bronze
 Jürg Röthlisberger — Judo, Men's Half-Heavyweight (93 kg)
 Jean-Blaise Evéquoz, Christian Kauter, Michel Poffet, Daniel Giger and François Suchanecki — Fencing, Men's Épée Team Competition

Athletics

Men's 800 metres
 Rolf Gysin
 Heat — 1:48.69 (→ did not advance)

Men's 5.000 metres
 Markus Ryffel
 Heat — 13:46.07 (→ did not advance)

Men's Long Jump 
 Rolf Bernhard
 Qualification — 7.79m
 Final — 7.74m (→ 9th place)

Cycling

Six cyclists represented Switzerland in 1976.

Individual road race
 Richard Trinkler — 5:05:00 (→ 57th place) 
 Hansjörg Aemisegger — did not finish (→ no ranking)
 Robert Thalmann — did not finish (→ no ranking)
 Serge Demierre — did not finish (→ no ranking)

1000m time trial
 Walter Bäni — 1:08.112 (→ 8th place)

Individual pursuit
 Robert Dill-Bundi — 14th place

Equestrian

Fencing

Six fencers, all men, represented Switzerland in 1976.

Men's foil
 Patrice Gaille

Men's épée
 Christian Kauter
 François Suchanecki
 Daniel Giger

Men's team épée
 Daniel Giger, Christian Kauter, Michel Poffet, François Suchanecki, Jean-Blaise Evéquoz

Gymnastics

Judo

Modern pentathlon

One male pentathlete represented Switzerland in 1976.

Individual
 Serge Bindy

Rowing

Sailing

Shooting

Swimming

Weightlifting

References

Nations at the 1976 Summer Olympics
1976 Summer Olympics
1976 in Swiss sport